Amber is The Landmark Mandarin Oriental's modern French restaurant in the Central  district of Hong Kong. Richard Ekkebus is the executive chef.

2019 refurbishment
Amber reopened on 2 May 2019 after a four-month hiatus. Chef Richard Ekkebus has done away with dairy and cut down on sugar and salt, using soy, rice, cereal and nut milk in place of dairy; fermentation and products like seaweed instead of salt; and agave, maple, honey and raw sugar in lieu of sugar. He created 50 new dishes.

Signature dish
Hokkaido sea urchin with lobster Jell-O is the signature dish of Amber.

Awards
The restaurant received two stars in the Michelin Guide's inaugural 2009 Hong Kong and Macau edition.

It was also placed 37th in S. Pellegrino's 2011 World's 50 Best Restaurants list in 2011. It stays 37th in The World’s Best Restaurants Awards in 2013. Amber is ranked 21st in Asia's Best Restaurants in 2019.

Media attention
 Amber was featured in the TVB Payvision Lifestyle Channel's Be My Guest episode featuring Carol "Dodo" Cheng.

References

External links
 Hotel official website
 Restaurant official website

Companies with year of establishment missing
Michelin Guide starred restaurants in Hong Kong
French restaurants in Hong Kong